Gyratrix hermaphroditus is a species of rhabdocoel flatworms in the family Polycystididae.

Description 
The animal is 1 to 1,5 mm long, transparent and colorless. It possesses a proboscis at the anterior end and a sharply pointed stylet.

Taxonomy 
It was described by Christian Gottfried Ehrenberg in 1831. Gyratrix hermaphroditus represents a species complex.

Distribution and Habitat 
Members of the species complex occur in both marine and inland water habitats.

Ecology and Behavior 

It is known to feed on copepods and cladocerans.

References 

rhabdocoela
Platyhelminthes